Pharhari is a village in the district of Haripur, Khyber Pakhtunkhwa, Pakistan. Its population is c. 5,000. Pharhari is situated in a valley, surrounded by mountains on the east, north, and south.

History  
Pharhari was part of the district of Abbottabad until 1992, after which it merged with another, newly formed district.

References

Villages in Khyber Pakhtunkhwa